So Much for So Little is a 1949 American animated short documentary film directed by Chuck Jones and Friz Freleng. In 1950, it won an Oscar at the 22nd Academy Awards for Documentary Short Subject, tying with A Chance to Live. It was created by Warner Bros. Cartoons for the United States Public Health Service. As a work of the United States Government, the film is in the public domain. The Academy Film Archive preserved So Much for So Little in 2005. Produced during the Harry S. Truman administration, it attained renewed relevance during the modern Medicare for All movement in the United States nearly seven decades later.

Plot
The cartoon begins by stating that, annually, 118,481 babies — out of well over two million born — will die before reaching their first birthday. From there, we are shown John E. Jones, a baby who, unless good oversight of the environment is maintained and John himself is provided consistently good healthcare, may potentially add to this statistic.

Most of John's life is depicted: his school years, marriage, later life (as a father), and his golden years. Along the way, health service information is detailed.  Before the film ends, it rewinds and returns to John as a baby, reminding the audience about the importance of proper, ongoing care availability to ensure he enjoys a robust, full life. The viewers are informed that it costs each American just three cents a week to safeguard John's, and all babies', well being.

Home media
This documentary short appeared as bonus features in Looney Tunes Golden Collection: Volume 2 and Looney Tunes Platinum Collection: Volume 1. It was remastered in Warner Bros. Home Entertainment Academy Awards Animation Collection: 15 Winners and Warner Bros. Home Entertainment Academy Awards Animation Collection.

See also
 Infant mortality

References

External links
 
 So Much for So Little at the National Archives and Records Administration
 

1949 films
1949 animated films
1949 short films
1940s animated short films
1949 documentary films
1940s short documentary films
1940s Warner Bros. animated short films
American short documentary films
Best Documentary Short Subject Academy Award winners
Short films directed by Chuck Jones
American animated documentary films
Documentary films about health care
American social guidance and drug education films
Warner Bros. Cartoons animated short films
Films scored by Carl Stalling
Articles containing video clips
1940s English-language films